Breast tension is a constellation of symptoms involving the breasts including:

 Breast pain
 Breast engorgement

Breast diseases